Skirlaugh A.R.L.F.C are an amateur rugby league football club based in Skirlaugh, East Riding of Yorkshire, England. The club's first team plays in the National Conference League.

Honours
 National Conference League Premier Division
 Winners (1): 2006–07
 National Conference League Division One
 Winners (1): 1997–98
 BARLA National Cup
 Winners (4): 1995–96, 1998–99, 1999–2000, 2005–06

External links
 Official website
 Skirlaugh on the NCL website

BARLA teams
English rugby league teams
1980 establishments in England
Rugby clubs established in 1980
Sport in the East Riding of Yorkshire
Rugby league teams in the East Riding of Yorkshire